This list of birds of Kentucky includes species documented in the U.S. state of Kentucky by the Kentucky Bird Records Committee (KBRC) of the Kentucky Ornithological Society through November 2019. Another accidental species has been documented since that date. Of the 391 species, 105 are classed as accidental and six were introduced to North America. Four are extinct and three have been extirpated. An additional nine species are hypothetical as defined below. Birds that are considered probable escapees, although they may have been sighted flying free, are not included.

This list is presented in the taxonomic sequence of the Check-list of North and Middle American Birds, 7th edition through the 62nd Supplement, published by the American Ornithological Society (AOS). Common and scientific names are also those of the Check-list, except that the common names of families are from the Clements taxonomy because the AOS list does not include them.

The following tags are used to designate some species:

(A) Accidental - A species on the Kentucky review list, for which the KOS requires documentation 
(E) Extirpated - a species which no longer occurs in Kentucky but exists elsewhere
(X) Extinct - a recent species that no longer exists
(I) Introduced - a species established solely as result of direct or indirect human intervention
(H) Hypothetical - species with only sight records or questionable reports, which also require documentation

Ducks, geese, and waterfowl

Order: AnseriformesFamily: Anatidae

The family Anatidae includes the ducks and most duck-like waterfowl, such as geese and swans. These birds are adapted to an aquatic existence with webbed feet, bills which are flattened to a greater or lesser extent, and feathers that are excellent at shedding water due to special oils. Forty-three species have been recorded in Kentucky.

Black-bellied whistling-duck, Dendrocygna autumnalis (A)
Fulvous whistling-duck, Dendrocygna bicolor (A)
Snow goose, Anser caerulescens
Ross's goose, Anser rossii
Greater white-fronted goose, Anser albifrons
Brant, Branta bernicla (A)
Barnacle goose, Branta leucopsis (H)
Cackling goose, Branta hutchinsii
Canada goose, Branta canadensis
Mute swan, Cygnus olor (I)
Trumpeter swan, Cygnus buccinator (A)
Tundra swan, Cygnus columbianus
Wood duck, Aix sponsa
Cinnamon teal, Spatula cyanoptera (A)
Northern shoveler, Spatula clypeata
Gadwall, Mareca strepera
Eurasian wigeon, Mareca penelope (A)
American wigeon, Mareca americana
Mallard, Anas platyrhynchos
American black duck, Anas rubripes
Mottled Duck, Anas fulvigula (A)
Northern pintail, Anas acuta
Blue-winged teal, Anas discors
Green-winged teal, Anas crecca carolinensis
Canvasback, Aythya valisineria
Redhead, Aythya americana
Ring-necked duck, Aythya collaris
Tufted duck, Aythya fuligula (A)
Greater scaup, Aythya marila
Lesser scaup, Aythya affinis
King eider, Somateria spectabilis (A)
Harlequin duck, Histrionicus histrionicus (A)
Surf scoter, Melanitta perspicillata
White-winged scoter, Melanitta deglandi
Black scoter, Melanitta americana
Long-tailed duck, Clangula hyemalis
Bufflehead, Bucephala albeola
Common goldeneye, Bucephala clangula
Barrow's goldeneye, Bucephala islandica (H)
Hooded merganser, Lophodytes cucullatus
Common merganser, Mergus merganser
Red-breasted merganser, Mergus serrator
Ruddy duck, Oxyura jamaicensis

New World quail
Order: GalliformesFamily: Odontophoridae

The New World quails are small, plump terrestrial birds only distantly related to the quails of the Old World, but named for their similar appearance and habits. One species has been recorded in Kentucky.

Northern bobwhite, Colinus virginianus

Pheasants, grouse, and allies

Order: GalliformesFamily: Phasianidae

Phasianidae consists of the pheasants and their allies. These are terrestrial species, variable in size but generally plump with broad relatively short wings. Many species are gamebirds or have been domesticated as a food source for humans. Three species have been recorded in Kentucky.

Wild turkey, Meleagris gallopavo
Ruffed grouse, Bonasa umbellus
Greater prairie-chicken, Tympanuchus cupido (A) (E)

Grebes
Order: PodicipediformesFamily: Podicipedidae

Grebes are small to medium-large freshwater diving birds. They have lobed toes and are excellent swimmers and divers. However, they have their feet placed far back on the body, making them quite ungainly on land. Five species have been recorded in Kentucky.

Pied-billed grebe, Podilymbus podiceps
Horned grebe, Podiceps auritus
Red-necked grebe, Podiceps grisegena
Eared grebe, Podiceps nigricollis
Western grebe, Aechmorphorus occidentalis (A)

Pigeons and doves

Order: ColumbiformesFamily: Columbidae

Pigeons and doves are stout-bodied birds with short necks and short slender bills with a fleshy cere. Eight species have been recorded in Kentucky.

Rock pigeon, Columba livia (I)
Band-tailed pigeon, Patagioenas fasciata (A)
Eurasian collared-dove, Streptopelia decaocto (I)
Passenger pigeon, Ectopistes migratorius (X)
Inca dove, Columbina inca (A)
Common ground dove, Columbina passerina (A)
White-winged dove, Zenaida asiatica (A)
Mourning dove, Zenaida macroura

Cuckoos

Order: CuculiformesFamily: Cuculidae

The family Cuculidae includes cuckoos, roadrunners, and anis. These birds are of variable size with slender bodies, long tails, and strong legs. The Old World cuckoos are brood parasites. Three species have been recorded in Kentucky.

Groove-billed ani, Crotophaga sulcirostris (A)
Yellow-billed cuckoo, Coccyzus americanus
Black-billed cuckoo, Coccyzus erythropthalmus

Nightjars and allies

Order: CaprimulgiformesFamily: Caprimulgidae

Nightjars are medium-sized nocturnal birds that usually nest on the ground. They have long wings, short legs, and very short bills. Most have small feet, of little use for walking, and long pointed wings. Their soft plumage is cryptically colored to resemble bark or leaves. Three species have been recorded in Kentucky.

Common nighthawk,  Chordeiles minor
Chuck-will's-widow, Antrostomus carolinensis
Eastern whip-poor-will, Antrostomus vociferus

Swifts
Order: ApodiformesFamily: Apodidae

The swifts are small birds which spend the majority of their lives flying. These birds have very short legs and never settle voluntarily on the ground, perching instead only on vertical surfaces. Many swifts have very long, swept-back wings which resemble a crescent or boomerang. One species has been recorded in Kentucky.

Chimney swift, Chaetura pelagica

Hummingbirds

Order: ApodiformesFamily: Trochilidae

Hummingbirds are small birds capable of hovering in mid-air due to the rapid flapping of their wings. They are the only birds that can fly backwards. Four species have been recorded in Kentucky.

Mexican violetear, Colibri thalassinus (A)
Ruby-throated hummingbird, Archilochus colubris
Black-chinned hummingbird, Archilochus alexandri (A)
Rufous hummingbird, Selasphorus rufus

Rails, gallinules, and coots

Order: GruiformesFamily: Rallidae

Rallidae is a large family of small to medium-sized birds which includes the rails, crakes, coots, and gallinules. The most typical family members occupy dense vegetation in damp environments near lakes, swamps, or rivers. In general they are shy and secretive birds, making them difficult to observe. Most species have strong legs and long toes which are well adapted to soft uneven surfaces. They tend to have short, rounded wings and tend to be weak fliers. Eight species have been recorded in Kentucky.

King rail, Rallus elegans (A)
Virginia rail, Rallus limicola
Sora, Porzana carolina
Common gallinule, Gallinula galeata
American coot, Fulica americana
Purple gallinule, Porphyrio martinicus (A)
Yellow rail, Coturnicops noveboracensis (A)
Black rail, Laterallus jamaicensis (H)

Cranes
Order: GruiformesFamily: Gruidae

Cranes are large, long-legged and long-necked birds. Unlike the similar-looking but unrelated herons, cranes fly with necks outstretched, not pulled back. Most have elaborate and noisy courting displays or "dances". Two species have been recorded in Kentucky.

Sandhill crane, Antigone canadensis
Whooping crane, Grus americana ("natural" (non-introduced) birds are considered (E))

Stilts and avocets
Order: CharadriiformesFamily: Recurvirostridae

Recurvirostridae is a family of large wading birds which includes the avocets and stilts. The avocets have long legs and long up-curved bills. The stilts have extremely long legs and long, thin, straight bills. Two species have been recorded in Kentucky.

Black-necked stilt, Himantopus mexicanus
American avocet, Recurvirostra americana

Plovers and lapwings

Order: CharadriiformesFamily: Charadriidae

The family Charadriidae includes the plovers, dotterels, and lapwings. They are small to medium-sized birds with compact bodies, short thick necks, and long, usually pointed, wings. They are found in open country worldwide, mostly in habitats near water. Five species have been recorded in Kentucky.

Killdeer, Charadrius vociferus
Black-bellied plover, Pluvialis squatarola
American golden-plover, Pluvialis dominica
Semipalmated plover, Charadrius semipalmatus
Piping plover, Charadrius melodus

Sandpipers and allies

Order: CharadriiformesFamily: Scolopacidae

Scolopacidae is a large diverse family of small to medium-sized shorebirds including the sandpipers, curlews, godwits, shanks, tattlers, woodcocks, snipes, dowitchers, and phalaropes. The majority of these species eat small invertebrates picked out of the mud or soil. Different lengths of legs and bills enable multiple species to feed in the same habitat, particularly on the coast, without direct competition for food. Thirty-five species have been recorded in Kentucky.

Upland sandpiper, Bartramia longicauda
Whimbrel, Numenius phaeopus (A)
Long-billed curlew, Numenius americanus (H)
Hudsonian godwit, Limosa haemastica (A)
Marbled godwit, Limosa fedoa
Ruddy turnstone, Arenaria interpres
Red knot, Calidris canutus (A)
Ruff, Calidris pugnax (A)
Stilt sandpiper, Calidris himantopus
Curlew sandpiper, Calidris ferruginea (A)
Red-necked stint, Calidris ruficollis (A)
Sanderling, Calidris alba
Dunlin, Calidris alpina
Purple sandpiper, Calidris maritima (H)
Baird's sandpiper, Calidris bairdii
Little stint, Calidris minuta (A)
Least sandpiper, Calidris minutilla
White-rumped sandpiper, Calidris fuscicollis
Buff-breasted sandpiper, Calidris subruficollis
Pectoral sandpiper, Calidris melanotos
Semipalmated sandpiper, Calidris pusilla
Western sandpiper, Calidris mauri
Short-billed dowitcher, Limnodromus griseus
Long-billed dowitcher, Limnodromus scolopaceus
American woodcock, Scolopax minor
Wilson's snipe, Gallinago delicata
Spotted sandpiper, Actitis macularius
Solitary sandpiper, Tringa solitaria
Lesser yellowlegs, Tringa flavipes
Willet, Tringa semipalmata
Greater yellowlegs, Tringa melanoleuca
Wilson's phalarope, Phalaropus tricolor
Red-necked phalarope, Phalaropus lobatus
Red phalarope, Phalaropus fulicarius (A)

Skuas and jaegers
Order: CharadriiformesFamily: Stercorariidae

They are in general medium to large birds, typically with gray or brown plumage, often with white markings on the wings. They have longish bills with hooked tips and webbed feet with sharp claws. They look like large dark gulls, but have a fleshy cere above the upper mandible. They are strong, acrobatic fliers. Three species have been recorded in Kentucky.

Pomarine jaeger, Stercorarius pomarinus (A)
Parasitic jaeger, Stercorarius parasiticus (A)
Long-tailed jaeger, Stercorarius longicaudus (A)

Auks, murres, and puffins
Order: CharadriiformesFamily: Alcidae

The family Alcidae includes auks, murres, and puffins. These are short winged birds that live on the open sea and normally only come ashore for breeding. One species has been recorded in Kentucky.

Long-billed murrelet, Brachyramphus perdix (A)

Gulls, terns, and skimmers

Order: CharadriiformesFamily: Laridae

Laridae is a family of medium to large seabirds and includes gulls, terns, kittiwakes, and skimmers. They are typically gray or white, often with black markings on the head or wings. They have stout, longish bills and webbed feet. Twenty-four species have been recorded in Kentucky.

Black-legged kittiwake, Rissa tridactyla (A)
Sabine's gull, Xema sabini (A)
Bonaparte's gull, Chroicocephalus philadelphia
Black-headed gull, Chroicocephalus ridibundus (A)
Little gull, Hydrocoleus minutus (A)
Laughing gull, Leucophaeus atricilla
Franklin's gull, Leucophaeus pipixcan
Common gull/short-billed gull, Larus canus/Larus brachyrhynchus (A)
Ring-billed gull, Larus delawarensis
California gull, Larus californicus  (A)
Herring gull, Larus argentatus
Iceland gull, Larus glaucoides
Lesser black-backed gull, Larus fuscus
Glaucous gull, Larus hyperboreus
Great black-backed gull, Larus marinus
Sooty tern, Onychoprion fuscatus (A)
Least tern, Sternula antillarum
Gull-billed tern, Gelochelidon nilotica (A)
Caspian tern, Hydroprogne caspia
Black tern, Chlidonias niger
Common tern, Sterna hirundo
Forster's tern, Sterna forsteri
Sandwich tern, Thalasseus sandvicensis (A)
Black skimmer, Rhyncops niger (A)

Loons
Order: GaviiformesFamily: Gaviidae

Loons are aquatic birds the size of a large duck, to which they are unrelated. Their plumage is largely gray or black, and they have spear-shaped bills. Loons swim well and fly adequately, but are almost hopeless on land, because their legs are placed towards the rear of the body. Four species have been recorded in Kentucky.

Red-throated loon, Gavia stellata
Pacific loon, Gavia pacifica (A)
Common loon, Gavia immer
Yellow-billed loon, Gavia adamsii (A)

Northern storm-petrels
Order: ProcellariiformesFamily: Hydrobatidae

The storm-petrels are the smallest seabirds, relatives of the petrels, feeding on planktonic crustaceans and small fish picked from the surface, typically while hovering. The flight is fluttering and sometimes bat-like. One species has been recorded in Kentucky.

Band-rumped storm-petrel, Hydrobates castro (A)

Shearwaters and petrels
Order: ProcellariiformesFamily: Procellariidae

The procellariids are the main group of medium-sized "true petrels", characterized by united nostrils with medium septum and a long outer functional primary. Three species have been recorded in Kentucky.

Black-capped petrel, Pterodroma hasitata (A)
Great shearwater, Ardenna gravis (A)
Audubon's shearwater, Puffinus lherminieri (A)

Storks
Order: CiconiiformesFamily: Ciconiidae

Storks are large, heavy, long-legged, long-necked wading birds with long stout bills and wide wingspans. They lack the powder down that other wading birds such as herons, spoonbills and ibises use to clean off fish slime. Storks lack a pharynx and are mute. One species has been recorded in Kentucky.

Wood stork, Mycteria americana (A)

Frigatebirds

Order: SuliformesFamily: Fregatidae

Frigatebirds are large seabirds usually found over tropical oceans. They are large, black, or black-and-white, with long wings and deeply forked tails. The males have colored inflatable throat pouches. They do not swim or walk and cannot take off from a flat surface. Having the largest wingspan-to-body-weight ratio of any bird, they are essentially aerial, able to stay aloft for more than a week. One species has been recorded in Kentucky

Magnificent frigatebird, Fregata magnificens (A)

Boobies and gannets
Order: SuliformesFamily: Sulidae

The sulids comprise the gannets and boobies. Both groups are medium-large coastal seabirds that plunge-dive for fish. One species has been recorded in Kentucky.

Northern gannet, Morus bassanus (A)

Anhingas
Order: SuliformesFamily: Anhingidae

Anhingas are cormorant-like water birds with very long necks and long, straight beaks. They are fish eaters which often swim with only their neck above the water. One species has been recorded in Kentucky.

Anhinga, Anhinga anhinga (A)

Cormorants and shags
Order: SuliformesFamily: Phalacrocoracidae

Cormorants are medium-to-large aquatic birds, usually with mainly dark plumage and areas of colored skin on the face. The bill is long, thin, and sharply hooked. Their feet are four-toed and webbed. Two species have been recorded in Kentucky.

Double-crested cormorant, Nannopterum auritumNeotropic cormorant, Nannopterum brasilianum (A)

Pelicans

Order: PelecaniformesFamily: Pelecanidae

Pelicans are very large water birds with a distinctive pouch under their beak. Like other birds in the order Pelecaniformes, they have four webbed toes. Two species have been recorded in Kentucky.

American white pelican, Pelecanus erythrorhynchosBrown pelican, Pelecanus occidentalis (A)

Herons, egrets, and bitterns

Order: PelecaniformesFamily: Ardeidae

The family Ardeidae contains the herons, egrets, and bitterns. Herons and egrets are medium to large wading birds with long necks and legs. Bitterns tend to be shorter-necked and more secretive. Members of Ardeidae fly with their necks retracted, unlike other long-necked birds such as storks, ibises, and spoonbills. Twelve species have been recorded in Kentucky.

American bittern, Botaurus lentiginosusLeast bittern, Ixobrychus exilisGreat blue heron, Ardea herodiasGreat egret, Ardea albaSnowy egret, Egretta thulaLittle blue heron, Egretta caeruleaTricolored heron, Egretta tricolor (A)
Reddish egret, Egretta rufescens (A)
Cattle egret, Bubulcus ibisGreen heron, Butorides virescensBlack-crowned night-heron, Nycticorax nycticoraxYellow-crowned night-heron, Nyctanassa violaceaIbises and spoonbills
Order: PelecaniformesFamily: Threskiornithidae

The family Threskiornithidae includes the ibises and spoonbills. They have long, broad wings. Their bodies tend to be elongated, the neck more so, with rather long legs. The bill is also long, decurved in the case of the ibises, straight and distinctively flattened in the spoonbills. Four species have been recorded in Kentucky.

White ibis, Eudocimus albusGlossy ibis, Plegadis falcinellus (A)
White-faced ibis, Plegadis chihi (A)
Roseate spoonbill, Platalea ajaja (A)

New World vultures
Order: CathartiformesFamily: Cathartidae

The New World vultures are not closely related to Old World vultures, but superficially resemble them because of convergent evolution. Like the Old World vultures, they are scavengers, however, unlike Old World vultures, which find carcasses by sight, New World vultures have a good sense of smell with which they locate carcasses. Two species have been recorded in Kentucky.

Black vulture, Coragyps atratusTurkey vulture, Cathartes auraOsprey
Order: AccipitriformesFamily: Pandionidae

Pandionidae is a family of fish-eating birds of prey, possessing a very large, powerful hooked beak for tearing flesh from their prey, strong legs, powerful talons, and keen eyesight. The family is monotypic.

Osprey, Pandion haliaetusHawks, eagles, and kites

Order: AccipitriformesFamily: Accipitridae

Accipitridae is a family of birds of prey which includes hawks, eagles, kites, harriers, and Old World vultures. These birds have very large powerful hooked beaks for tearing flesh from their prey, strong legs, powerful talons, and keen eyesight. Fifteen species have been recorded in Kentucky.

White-tailed kite, Elanus leucurus (A)
Swallow-tailed kite, Elanoides forficatus (A) (E)
Golden eagle, Aquila chrysaetosNorthern harrier, Circus hudsoniusSharp-shinned hawk, Accipiter striatusCooper's hawk, Accipiter cooperiiNorthern goshawk, Accipiter gentilis (A)
Bald eagle, Haliaeetus leucocephalusMississippi kite, Ictinia mississippiensisRed-shouldered hawk, Buteo lineatusBroad-winged hawk, Buteo platypterusSwainson's hawk, Buteo swainsoni (A)
Red-tailed hawk, Buteo jamaicensisRough-legged hawk, Buteo lagopusFerruginous hawk, Buteo regalis (A)

Barn-owls
Order: StrigiformesFamily: Tytonidae

Barn-owls are medium to large owls with large heads and characteristic heart-shaped faces. They have long strong legs with powerful talons. One species has been recorded in Kentucky.

Barn owl, Tyto albaOwls

Order: StrigiformesFamily: Strigidae

Typical owls are small to large solitary nocturnal birds of prey. They have large forward-facing eyes and ears, a hawk-like beak, and a conspicuous circle of feathers around each eye called a facial disk. Eight species have been recorded in Kentucky.

Eastern screech-owl, Megascops asioGreat horned owl, Bubo virginianusSnowy owl, Bubo scandiacus (A)
Burrowing owl, Athene cunicularia (A)
Barred owl, Strix variaLong-eared owl, Asio otusShort-eared owl, Asio flammeusNorthern saw-whet owl, Aegolius acadicusKingfishers
Order: CoraciiformesFamily: Alcedinidae

Kingfishers are medium-sized birds with large heads, long, pointed bills, short legs, and stubby tails. One species has been recorded in Kentucky.

Belted kingfisher, Megaceryle alcyonWoodpeckers

Order: PiciformesFamily: Picidae

Woodpeckers are small to medium-sized birds with chisel-like beaks, short legs, stiff tails, and long tongues used for capturing insects. Some species have feet with two toes pointing forward and two backward, while several species have only three toes. Many woodpeckers have the habit of tapping noisily on tree trunks with their beaks. Nine species have been recorded in Kentucky.

Red-headed woodpecker, Melanerpes erythrocephalusRed-bellied woodpecker, Melanerpes carolinusYellow-bellied sapsucker, Sphyrapicus variusDowny woodpecker, Dryobates pubescensRed-cockaded woodpecker, Dryobates borealis (E)
Hairy woodpecker, Dryobates villosusNorthern flicker, Colaptes auratusPileated woodpecker, Dryocopus pileatusIvory-billed woodpecker, Campephilus principalis (X)

Falcons and caracaras
Order: FalconiformesFamily: Falconidae

Falconidae is a family of diurnal birds of prey, notably the falcons and caracaras. They differ from hawks, eagles, and kites in that they kill with their beaks instead of their talons. Four species have been recorded in Kentucky.

American kestrel, Falco sparveriusMerlin, Falco columbariusPeregrine falcon, Falco peregrinusPrairie falcon, Falco mexicanus (A)

New World and African parrots
Order: PsittaciformesFamily: Psittacidae

Parrots are small to large birds with a characteristic curved beak. Their upper mandibles have slight mobility in the joint with the skull and they have a generally erect stance. All parrots are zygodactyl, having the four toes on each foot placed two at the front and two to the back. Most of the more than 150 species in this family are found in the New World. One species has been recorded in Kentucky.

Carolina parakeet, Conuropsis carolinensis (X)

Tyrant flycatchers

Order: PasseriformesFamily: Tyrannidae

Tyrant flycatchers are Passerine birds which occur throughout North and South America. They superficially resemble the Old World flycatchers, but are more robust and have stronger bills. They do not have the sophisticated vocal capabilities of the songbirds. Most, but not all, are rather plain. As the name implies, most are insectivorous. Seventeen species have been recorded in Kentucky.

Ash-throated flycatcher, Myiarchus cinerascens (A)
Great crested flycatcher, Myiarchus crinitusWestern kingbird, Tyrannus verticalis (A)
Eastern kingbird, Tyrannus tyrannusGray kingbird, Tyrannus dominicensis (A)
Scissor-tailed flycatcher, Tyrannus forficatusFork-tailed flycatcher, Tyrannus savana (H)
Olive-sided flycatcher, Contopus cooperiEastern wood-pewee, Contopus virensYellow-bellied flycatcher, Empidonax flaviventrisAcadian flycatcher, Empidonax virescensAlder flycatcher, Empidonax alnorumWillow flycatcher, Empidonax trailliiLeast flycatcher, Empidonax minimusEastern phoebe, Sayornis phoebeSay's phoebe, Sayornis saya (A)
Vermilion flycatcher, Pyrocephalus rubinus (A)

Vireos, shrike-babblers, and erpornis

Order: PasseriformesFamily: Vireonidae

The vireos are a group of small to medium-sized passerine birds. They are typically greenish in color and resemble wood-warblers apart from their heavier bills. Seven species have been recorded in Kentucky.

White-eyed vireo, Vireo griseusBell's vireo, Vireo belliiYellow-throated vireo, Vireo flavifronsBlue-headed vireo, Vireo solitariusPhiladelphia vireo, Vireo philadelphicusWarbling vireo, Vireo gilvusRed-eyed vireo, Vireo olivaceusShrikes
Order: PasseriformesFamily: Laniidae

Shrikes are passerine birds known for their habit of catching other birds and small animals and impaling the uneaten portions of their bodies on thorns. A shrike's beak is hooked, like that of a typical bird of prey. Two species have been recorded in Kentucky.

Loggerhead shrike, Lanius ludovicianusNorthern shrike, Lanius borealis (A)

Crows, jays, and magpies

Order: PasseriformesFamily: Corvidae

The family Corvidae includes crows, ravens, jays, choughs, magpies, treepies, nutcrackers, and ground jays. Corvids are above average in size among the Passeriformes, and some of the larger species show high levels of intelligence. Four species have been recorded in Kentucky.

Blue jay, Cyanocitta cristataAmerican crow, Corvus brachyrhynchosFish crow, Corvus ossifragusCommon raven, Corvus coraxTits, chickadees, and titmice

Order: PasseriformesFamily: Paridae

The Paridae are mainly small stocky woodland species with short stout bills. Some have crests. They are adaptable birds, with a mixed diet including seeds and insects. Three species have been recorded in Kentucky.

Carolina chickadee, Poecile carolinensisBlack-capped chickadee, Poecile atricapilla (A)
Tufted titmouse, Baeolophus bicolorLarks
Order: PasseriformesFamily: Alaudidae

Larks are small terrestrial birds with often extravagant songs and display flights. Most larks are fairly dull in appearance. Their food is insects and seeds. One species has been recorded in Kentucky.

Horned lark, Eremophila alpestrisSwallows

Order: PasseriformesFamily: Hirundinidae

The family Hirundinidae is adapted to aerial feeding. They have a slender streamlined body, long pointed wings, and a short bill with a wide gape. The feet are adapted to perching rather than walking, and the front toes are partially joined at the base. Seven species have been recorded in Kentucky.

Bank swallow, Riparia ripariaTree swallow, Tachycineta bicolorNorthern rough-winged swallow, Stelgidopteryx serripennisPurple martin, Progne subisBarn swallow, Hirundo rusticaCliff swallow, Petrochelidon pyrrhonotaCave swallow, Petrochelidon fulva (A)

Kinglets
Order: PasseriformesFamily: Regulidae

The kinglets are a small family of birds which resemble the titmice. They are very small insectivorous birds. The adults have colored crowns, giving rise to their names. Two species have been recorded in Kentucky.

Ruby-crowned kinglet, Corthylio calendulaGolden-crowned kinglet, Regulus satrapaWaxwings
Order: PasseriformesFamily: Bombycillidae

The waxwings are a group of passerine birds with soft silky plumage and unique red tips to some of the wing feathers. In the Bohemian and cedar waxwings, these tips look like sealing wax and give the group its name. These are arboreal birds of northern forests. They live on insects in summer and berries in winter. One species has been recorded in Kentucky.

Cedar waxwing, Bombycilla cedrorumNuthatches
Order: PasseriformesFamily: Sittidae

Nuthatches are small woodland birds. They have the unusual ability to climb down trees head first, unlike other birds which can only go upwards. Nuthatches have big heads, short tails, and powerful bills and feet. Three species have been recorded in Kentucky.

Red-breasted nuthatch, Sitta canadensisWhite-breasted nuthatch, Sitta carolinensisBrown-headed nuthatch, Sitta pusilla (A) (if outside Land Between the Lakes or London areas)

Treecreepers
Order: PasseriformesFamily: Certhiidae

Treecreepers are small woodland birds, brown above and white below. They have thin pointed down-curved bills, which they use to extricate insects from bark. They have stiff tail feathers, like woodpeckers, which they use to support themselves on vertical trees. One species has been recorded in Kentucky.

Brown creeper, Certhia americanaGnatcatchers
Order: PasseriformesFamily: Polioptilidae

These dainty birds resemble Old World warblers in their structure and habits, moving restlessly through the foliage seeking insects. The gnatcatchers are mainly soft bluish gray in color and have the typical insectivore's long sharp bill. Many species have distinctive black head patterns (especially males) and long, regularly cocked, black-and-white tails. One species has been recorded in Kentucky.

Blue-gray gnatcatcher, Polioptila caeruleaWrens

Order: PasseriformesFamily: Troglodytidae

Wrens are small and inconspicuous birds, except for their loud songs. They have short wings and thin down-turned bills. Several species often hold their tails upright. All are insectivorous. Seven species have been recorded in Kentucky.

Rock wren, Salpinctes obsoletus (A)
House wren, Troglodytes aedonWinter wren, Troglodytes hiemalisSedge wren, Cistothorus platensisMarsh wren, Cistothorus palustrisCarolina wren, Thryothorus ludovicianusBewick's wren, Thryomanes bewickii (A)

Mockingbirds and thrashers
Order: PasseriformesFamily: Mimidae

The mimids are a family of passerine birds which includes thrashers, mockingbirds, tremblers and the New World catbirds. These birds are notable for their vocalization, especially their remarkable ability to mimic a wide variety of birds and other sounds heard outdoors. The species tend towards dull grays and browns in their appearance. Three species have been recorded in Kentucky.

Gray catbird, Dumetella carolinensisBrown thrasher, Toxostoma rufumNorthern mockingbird, Mimus polyglottosStarlings
Order: PasseriformesFamily: Sturnidae

Starlings are small to medium-sized passerine birds. They are medium-sized passerines with strong feet. Their flight is strong and direct and they are very gregarious. Their preferred habitat is fairly open country, and they eat insects and fruit. Plumage is typically dark with a metallic sheen. One species has been recorded in Kentucky.

European starling, Sturnus vulgaris (I)

Thrushes and allies

Order: PasseriformesFamily: Turdidae

The thrushes are a group of passerine birds that occur mainly but not exclusively in the Old World. They are plump, soft plumaged, small to medium-sized insectivores or sometimes omnivores, often feeding on the ground. Nine species have been recorded in Kentucky.

Eastern bluebird, Sialia sialisMountain bluebird, Sialia currucoides (A)
Veery, Catharus fuscescensGray-cheeked thrush, Catharus minimusSwainson's thrush, Catharus ustulatusHermit thrush, Catharus guttatusWood thrush, Hylocichla mustelinaAmerican robin, Turdus migratoriusVaried thrush, Ixoreus naevius (A)

Old World sparrows

Order: PasseriformesFamily: Passeridae

Old World sparrows are small passerine birds. In general, sparrows tend to be small plump brownish or grayish birds with short tails and short powerful beaks. Sparrows are seed eaters, but they also consume small insects. Two species have been recorded in Kentucky.

House sparrow, Passer domesticus (I)
Eurasian tree sparrow, Passer montanus (I) (A)

Wagtails and pipits
Order: PasseriformesFamily: Motacillidae

Motacillidae is a family of small passerine birds with medium to long tails. They include the wagtails, longclaws, and pipits. They are slender ground-feeding insectivores of open country. Two species have been recorded in Kentucky.

American pipit, Anthus rubescensSprague's pipit, Anthus spragueii (H)

Finches, euphonias, and allies

Order: PasseriformesFamily: Fringillidae

Finches are seed-eating passerine birds, that are small to moderately large and have a strong beak, usually conical and in some species very large. All have twelve tail feathers and nine primaries. These birds have a bouncing flight with alternating bouts of flapping and gliding on closed wings, and most sing well. Ten species have been recorded in Kentucky.

Evening grosbeak, Coccothraustes vespertinus (A)
Pine grosbeak, Pinicola enucleator (H)
House finch, Haemorhous mexicanus (Native to the southwestern U.S.; introduced in the east)
Purple finch, Haemorhous purpureusCommon redpoll, Acanthis flammea (A)
Red crossbill, Loxia curvirostra (A)
White-winged crossbill, Loxia leucoptera (A)
Pine siskin, Spinus pinusLesser goldfinch, Spinus psaltria (A)
American goldfinch, Spinus tristisLongspurs and snow buntings
Order: PasseriformesFamily: Calcariidae

The Calcariidae are a group of passerine birds that have been traditionally grouped with the New World sparrows but differ in a number of respects and are usually found in open grassy areas.  Three species have been recorded in Kentucky.

Lapland longspur, Calcarius lapponicusSmith's longspur, Calcarius pictus (A)
Snow bunting, Plectrophenax nivalisNew World sparrows

Order: PasseriformesFamily: Passerellidae

Until 2017, these species were considered part of the family Emberizidae. Most of the species are known as sparrows, but these birds are not closely related to the Old World sparrows which are in the family Passeridae. Many of these have distinctive head patterns. Twenty-six species have been recorded in Kentucky.

Bachman's sparrow, Peucaea aestivalis (A) (if outside Fort Campbell)
Grasshopper sparrow, Ammodramus savannarumLark sparrow, Chondestes grammacusLark bunting, Calamospiza melanocorys (A)
Chipping sparrow, Spizella passerinaClay-colored sparrow, Spizella pallidaField sparrow, Spizella pusillaBrewer's sparrow, Spizella breweri (A)
Fox sparrow, Passerella iliacaAmerican tree sparrow, Spizelloides arboreaDark-eyed junco, Junco hyemalisWhite-crowned sparrow, Zonotrichia leucophrysHarris's sparrow, Zonotrichia querula (A)
White-throated sparrow, Zonotrichia albicollisSagebrush sparrow, Artemisiospiza nevadensis (A)
Vesper sparrow, Pooecetes gramineusLeConte's sparrow, Ammospiza leconteiiNelson's sparrow, Ammospiza nelsoni (A) (if outside fall migratory period)
Henslow's sparrow, Centronyx henslowiiSavannah sparrow, Passerculus sandwichensisSong sparrow, Melospiza melodiaLincoln's sparrow, Melospiza lincolniiSwamp sparrow, Melospiza georgianaGreen-tailed towhee, Pipilo chlorurus (A)
Spotted towhee, Pipilo maculatus (A)
Eastern towhee, Pipilo erythrophthalmusYellow-breasted chat
Order: PasseriformesFamily: Icteriidae

This species was historically placed in the wood-warblers (Parulidae) but nonetheless most authorities were unsure if it belonged there. It was placed in its own family in 2017.

Yellow-breasted chat, Icteria virensTroupials and allies

Order: PasseriformesFamily: Icteridae

The icterids are a group of small to medium-sized, often colorful passerine birds restricted to the New World and include the grackles, New World blackbirds, and New World orioles. Most species have black as a predominant plumage color, often enlivened by yellow, orange, or red. Fourteen species have been recorded in Kentucky.

Yellow-headed blackbird, Xanthocephalus xanthocephalus (A)
Bobolink, Dolichonyx oryzivorusEastern meadowlark, Sturnella magnaWestern meadowlark, Sturnella neglectaOrchard oriole, Icterus spuriusHooded oriole, Icterus cucullatus (A)
Bullock's oriole, Icterus bullockii (A)
Baltimore oriole, Icterus galbulaScott's oriole, Icterus parisorum (A)
Red-winged blackbird, Agelaius phoen aterBrown-headed cowbird, Molothrus aterRusty blackbird, Euphagus carolinusBrewer's blackbird, Euphagus cyanocephalusCommon grackle, Quiscalus quisculaNew World warblers

Order: PasseriformesFamily: Parulidae

The wood-warblers are a group of small and often colorful passerine birds restricted to the New World. Most are arboreal, but some, like the ovenbird and the two waterthrushes, are more terrestrial. Most members of this family are insectivores. Thirty-nine species have been recorded in Kentucky.

Ovenbird, Seiurus aurocapillaWorm-eating warbler, Helmitheros vermivorusLouisiana waterthrush, Parkesia motacillaNorthern waterthrush, Parkesia noveboracensisBachman's warbler, Vermivora bachmanii (X)
Golden-winged warbler, Vermivora chrysopteraBlue-winged warbler, Vermivora cyanopteraBlack-and-white warbler, Mniotilta variaProthonotary warbler, Protonotaria citreaSwainson's warbler, Limnothlypis swainsoniiTennessee warbler, Leiothlypis peregrinaOrange-crowned warbler, Leiothlypis celataNashville warbler, Leiothlypis ruficapillaConnecticut warbler, Oporornis agilisMourning warbler, Geothlypis philadelphiaKentucky warbler, Geothlypis formosaCommon yellowthroat, Geothlypis trichasHooded warbler, Setophaga citrinaAmerican redstart, Setophaga ruticillaKirtland's warbler, Setophaga kirtlandii (H)
Cape May warbler, Setophaga tigrinaCerulean warbler, Setophaga ceruleaNorthern parula, Setophaga americanaMagnolia warbler, Setophaga magnoliaBay-breasted warbler, Setophaga castaneaBlackburnian warbler, Setophaga fuscaYellow warbler, Setophaga petechiaChestnut-sided warbler, Setophaga pensylvanicaBlackpoll warbler, Setophaga striataBlack-throated blue warbler, Setophaga caerulescensPalm warbler, Setophaga palmarumPine warbler, Setophaga pinusYellow-rumped warbler, Setophaga coronataYellow-throated warbler, Setophaga dominicaPrairie warbler, Setophaga discolorBlack-throated gray warbler, Setophaga nigrescens (A)
Black-throated green warbler, Setophaga virensCanada warbler, Cardellina canadensisWilson's warbler, Cardellina pusillaCardinals and allies

Order: PasseriformesFamily: Cardinalidae

The cardinals are a family of robust, seed-eating birds with strong bills. They are typically associated with open woodland. The sexes usually have distinct plumages. Ten species have been recorded in Kentucky.

Summer tanager, Piranga rubraScarlet tanager, Piranga olivaceaWestern tanager, Piranga ludoviciana (A)
Northern cardinal, Cardinalis cardinalisRose-breasted grosbeak, Pheucticus ludovicianusBlack-headed grosbeak, Pheucticus melanocephalus (A)
Blue grosbeak, Passerina caeruleaIndigo bunting, Passerina cyaneaPainted bunting, Passerina ciris (A)
Dickcissel, Spiza americana''

See also
List of birds
Lists of birds by region
List of North American birds

Notes

References

External links
 Kentucky Ornithological Society

Kentucky
Birds